The Coptic calendar, also called the Alexandrian calendar, is a liturgical calendar used by the Coptic Orthodox Church and also used by the farming populace in Egypt. It was used for fiscal purposes in Egypt until the adoption of the Gregorian calendar on 11 September (6 Nesi) 1875. This calendar is based on the ancient Egyptian calendar. To avoid the calendar creep of the latter (which contained only 365 days each year, year after year, so that the seasons shifted about one day every four years), a reform of the ancient Egyptian calendar was introduced at the time of Ptolemy III (Decree of Canopus, in 238 BC) which consisted of adding an extra day every fourth year. However, this reform was opposed by the Egyptian priests, and the reform was not adopted until 25 BC, when the Roman Emperor Augustus imposed the Decree upon Egypt as its official calendar (although initially, namely between 25 BC and AD 5, it was unsynchronized with the newly introduced Julian calendar which had erroneously been intercalating leap days every third year due to a misinterpretation of the leap year rule so as to apply inclusive counting). To distinguish it from the Ancient Egyptian calendar, which remained in use by some astronomers until medieval times, this reformed calendar is known as the Coptic or Alexandrian calendar. Its years and months coincide with those of the Ethiopian calendar but have different numbers and names.

Unlike the Gregorian calendar, the Coptic calendar does not skip leap years three times every 400 years, and therefore it stays synchronized with the Julian calendar over a four-year leap year cycle.

Coptic year 

The Coptic year is the extension of the ancient Egyptian civil year, retaining its subdivision into the three seasons, four months each. The three seasons are commemorated by special prayers in the Coptic Liturgy. This calendar is still in use all over Egypt by farmers to keep track of the various agricultural seasons.

The Coptic calendar has 13 months, 12 of 30 days each and one at the end of the year of 5 days, or 6 days in leap years. The Coptic Leap Year follows the same rules as the Julian Calendar so that the extra month always has six days in the year before a Julian Leap Year.

The year starts on the Feast of Neyrouz, the first day of the month of Thout, the first month of the Egyptian year. For 1901 to 2098 it coincides with the Gregorian Calendar's 11 September, or 12 September before a leap year, but for any year, it coincides with the Julian Calendar's 29 August, or 30 August before a leap year. Coptic years are counted from 284 AD, the year Diocletian became Roman Emperor, whose reign was marked by tortures and mass executions of Christians, especially in Egypt. Hence, the Coptic year is identified by the abbreviation A.M. (for Anno Martyrum or "Year of the Martyrs"). The first day of the year I of the Coptic era was 29 August 284 in the Julian calendar. Note that A.M. abbreviation is also used for unrelated calendar eras (such as the Byzantine and Jewish calendar epochs) which start at the putative creation of the world; it then stands for Anno Mundi.

Easter is reckoned by the Julian Calendar in combination with the uncorrected repetition of the 19-year Metonic cycle.

To obtain the Coptic year number, subtract from the Julian year number either 283 (before the Julian new year) or 284 (after it).

Date of Christmas 
Coptic Christmas is observed on what the Julian Calendar labels 25 December, a date that currently corresponds with 7 January on the more widely used Gregorian Calendar (which is also when Christmas is observed in Eastern Orthodox countries such as Russia). The 25 December Nativity of Christ was alleged very early by Hippolytus of Rome (170–236) in his Commentary on Daniel 4:23: "The first coming of our Lord, that in the flesh, in which he was born at Bethlehem, took place eight days before the calends of January, a Wednesday, in the forty-second year of the reign of Augustus, 5500 years from Adam."  "Another early source is Theophilus Bishop of Caesarea (115–181): "We ought to celebrate the birth-day of our Lord on what day soever the 25th of December shall happen." However, it was not until 367 that 25 December began to be universally accepted. Before that, the Eastern Church had kept 6 January as the Nativity under the name "Epiphany." John Chrysostom, in a sermon preached in Antioch in 387, relates how the correct date of the Nativity was brought to the East ten years earlier. Dionysius of Alexandria emphatically quoted mystical justifications for this very choice. 25 March was considered to be the anniversary of Creation itself. It was the first day of the year in the medieval Julian calendar and the nominal vernal equinox (it had been the actual equinox at the time when the Julian calendar was originally designed). Considering that Jesus was thought to have been conceived on that date, 25 March was recognized as the Feast of the Annunciation which had to be followed, nine months later, by the celebration of the birth of Christ, Christmas, on 25 December.

There may have been more practical considerations for choosing 25 December. The choice would help substitute a major Christian holiday for the popular Pagan celebrations surrounding the Winter Solstice (Roman Sol Sticia, the three-day stasis when the sun would rise consecutively in its southernmost point before heading north, 21, 22 and 23 December. In AD 274, Emperor Aurelian had declared a civil holiday on 25 December (the "Festival of the Birth of the Unconquered Sun") to celebrate the deity Sol Invictus. Finally, joyous festivals are needed at that time of year to fight the natural gloom of the season (in the Northern Hemisphere).

Until the 16th century, 25 December coincided with 29 Koiak of the Coptic calendar. However, upon the introduction of the Gregorian calendar in 1582, 25 December shifted 10 days earlier in comparison with the Julian and Coptic calendars. Furthermore, the Gregorian calendar drops 3 leap days every 400 years to closely approximate the length of a solar year. As a result, the Coptic Christmas advances a day each time the Gregorian calendar drops a leap day (years AD 1700, 1800, and 1900). This is the reason why Old-Calendarists (using the Julian and Coptic calendars) presently celebrate Christmas on 7 January, 13 days after the New-Calendarists (using the Gregorian calendar), who celebrate Christmas on 25 December. From AD 2101, the Coptic Christmas will be on the Gregorian date of 8 January.

Date of Easter 

The First Council of Nicaea (325) sent a letter to the Church of Alexandria stating “all our brethren in the East who formerly followed the custom of the Jews are henceforth to celebrate the said most sacred feast of Easter at the same time with the Romans and yourselves and all those who have observed Easter from the beginning.” 

At the Council of Nicaea, it became one of the duties of the patriarch of Alexandria to determine the dates of the Easter and to announce it to the other Christian churches. This duty fell on this officiate because of the erudition at Alexandria he could draw on. The rules to determine this are complex, but Easter is the first Sunday after a full moon occurring after the northern vernal equinox, which falls on or after 21 March. Shortly after Julius Caesar reformed the calendar, the northern vernal equinox was occurring on the nominal date of 25 March. This was abandoned shortly after Nicaea, but the reason for the observed discrepancy was all but ignored (the actual tropical year is not quite equal to the Julian year of 365 days, so the date of the equinox keeps creeping back in the Julian calendar).

Between the Catholic Church and the Orthodox Church, there are different dates for holidays. In recent years there have been multiple attempts to unify these dates. Some people are skeptical about the success of these attempts. Eastern Orthodox use the Julian calendar while Catholics use the Gregorian calendar. Pope Tawadros, the Coptic pope, and Pope Francis, the Catholic pope, agreed to the proposal to celebrate Easter on the same day. Pope Tawadros's suggested to celebrate Easter on the second Sunday of April.

Coptic months 
The following table refers to dates for Coptic years not containing February 29. Such years are preceded by a Coptic leap day at the end of the preceding year. This causes dates to move one day later in the Julian and Gregorian Calendars from the Coptic New Year's Day until the leap day of the Julian or Gregorian Calendar respectively.

Literature 
 Wolfgang Kosack: Der koptische Heiligenkalender. The Calendar of the Coptic Holies. Deutsch – Koptisch – Arabisch nach den besten Quellen neu bearbeitet und vollständig herausgegeben mit Index Sanctorum koptischer Heiliger, Index der Namen auf Koptisch, Koptische Patriarchenliste, Geografische Liste. Christoph Brunner, Berlin 2012, .

See also 
 Egyptian calendar
 Ethiopian calendar
 Computus
 Era of the Martyrs

Notes

References

External links 

 The Coptic Calendar of Martyrs
 "Seasonal Almanac Based on the Coptic Calendar" is an Arabic manuscript from 1678.
 The Coptic Calendar by Bishoy K. R. Dawood (1.29MB pdf file – historical development and technical discussion)
 An introduction to the Coptic calendar (Gregorian equivalents are valid only between 1900 and 2099)
 Ancient Egyptian Calendar and Coptic Calendar

25 BC establishments
Calendar eras
 
Calendar
Egyptian calendar
Liturgical calendars